José García (born 6 February 1960) is an Ecuadorian weightlifter. He competed in the men's featherweight event at the 1988 Summer Olympics.

References

1960 births
Living people
Ecuadorian male weightlifters
Olympic weightlifters of Ecuador
Weightlifters at the 1988 Summer Olympics
Place of birth missing (living people)
20th-century Ecuadorian people